The Sunda long-eared bat (Nyctophilus heran) is a species of vesper bat. It is found only in Indonesia.

References

Mammals described in 1991
Taxa named by Darrell Kitchener
Nyctophilus
Endemic fauna of Indonesia
Taxonomy articles created by Polbot
Bats of Indonesia